Toja can refer to:
one of the Uriankhai banners
Guido Toja (1870–1933), Italian actuary
Juan Carlos Toja (born 1985), Colombian footballer
Toju Nakae (1608–1648), Japanese philosopher